Thomas Mogensen (born 30 January 1983) is a Danish team handball player. He currently plays for SønderjyskE Håndbold. He was Danish champion and selected as the best player in Denmark in 2007.

Club play
Mogensen played for the Danish club GOG Svendborg TGI in the 2006/2007 season, when the club became Danish champions. He currently plays for the danish club SønderjyskE Håndbold.

Awards
Mogensen was voted Danish Player of the year 2007 in the Danish League (Selected by the players' committee)

References

External links

1983 births
Living people
Danish male handball players
SG Flensburg-Handewitt players
Viborg HK players
Handball players at the 2012 Summer Olympics
Olympic handball players of Denmark
People from Odder Municipality
Sportspeople from the Central Denmark Region